An ultra-triathlon covers more distance than an ITU 'long course,' or Ironman™ triathlon. The most common distances are the double, triple, quadruple, quintuple and deca triathlon. Unlike a standard triathlon event, an ultra-triathlon event may not necessarily involve the three component disciplines of triathlon (swimming, cycling and running) in direct consecutive order, but may instead consist of multiple consecutive individual triathlons performed on consecutive days, or may involve disciplines out of the usual order, such as the Enduroman that goes run-swim-bike to allow crossing of the English Channel.

The first ultra-distance race was held as a double in Huntsville, Alabama (USA) in 1985, and since then the distances have been expanding. While 20x and even 30x events have been held, the DECA, or 10x event, either in the 'continuous' version (swim-bike-run), or in the 'one-per-day' version is typically the longest distance that can be found on the race calendar every year. In 2020 and 2022, the swissultra DECA continuous was the IUTA World Championship over that distance.

The IUTA (International Ultra Triathlon Association) is the official governing body of Ultra Triathlon.

Standard distances

World records

Men

Women

References

External links
 International Ultra Triathlon Association

Endurance games
Individual sports
Triathlon
Multisports
Triathlon competitions